Close Encounters of the Third Kind is a 1977 American science fiction film written and directed by Steven Spielberg, starring Richard Dreyfuss, Melinda Dillon, Teri Garr, Bob Balaban, Cary Guffey, and François Truffaut. It tells the story of Roy Neary, an everyday blue-collar worker in Indiana, whose life changes after an encounter with a UFO.

Close Encounters was a long-cherished project for Spielberg. In late 1973, he developed a deal with Columbia Pictures for a science-fiction film. Though Spielberg received sole credit for the script, he was assisted by Paul Schrader, John Hill, David Giler, Hal Barwood, Matthew Robbins, and Jerry Belson, all of whom contributed to the screenplay in varying degrees. The title is derived from Ufologist J. Allen Hynek's classification of close encounters with extraterrestrials, in which the third kind denotes human observations of extraterrestrials or "animate beings". Douglas Trumbull served as the visual effects supervisor, while Carlo Rambaldi designed the extraterrestrials.

Made on a production budget of $19.4 million, Close Encounters was released in a limited number of cities on November 16 and 23, 1977, before expanding into wide release the following month. It was a critical and financial success, eventually grossing over $300 million worldwide. The film received numerous awards and nominations at the 50th Academy Awards, 32nd British Academy Film Awards, the 35th Golden Globe Awards and the 5th Saturn Awards, and has been widely acclaimed by the American Film Institute.

In December 2007, it was deemed "culturally, historically, or aesthetically significant" by the United States Library of Congress and selected for preservation in the National Film Registry. A Special Edition of the film, featuring both shortened and newly added scenes, was released theatrically in 1980. Spielberg agreed to do the special edition to add more scenes that they were unable to include in the original release, with the studio demanding a controversial scene depicting the interior of the extraterrestrial mothership. Spielberg's dissatisfaction with the altered ending scene led to a third version of the film, referred to as the Director's Cut, that was issued on VHS and LaserDisc in 1998 (and later DVD and Blu-ray). The director's cut is the longest version of the film, combining Spielberg's favorite elements from both previous editions but removing the scenes inside the extraterrestrial mothership. The film was later remastered in 4K and re-released in theatres on September 1, 2017 for its 40th anniversary.

Plot
In the Sonoran Desert, French scientist Claude Lacombe, his American interpreter, cartographer David Laughlin, and other researchers discover a flight of Grumman TBM Avengers that went missing shortly after World War II. The planes are in perfect condition, but without any occupants. An elderly witness nearby claims "the sun came out at night, and sang to him." Near Indianapolis, air traffic controllers watch two airline flights narrowly avoid a mid-air collision with an unidentified flying object (UFO).

At a rural home outside Muncie, Indiana, three-year-old Barry Guiler wakes to find his toys operating on their own. He starts to follow something outside, forcing his mother, Jillian, to chase after him. Large-scale power outages begin rolling through the area, forcing electrician Roy Neary to investigate. While he gets his bearings, Roy experiences a close encounter with a UFO, and when it flies over his truck, it lightly burns the side of his face with its lights. The UFO takes off with three others in the sky, as Roy and three police cars give chase. The spacecraft fly off into the night sky but the metaphysical experience leaves Roy mesmerized. He becomes fascinated by UFOs to the dismay of his wife, Ronnie, and begins obsessing over subliminal images of a mountain-like shape, often making models of it. Jillian meanwhile also becomes obsessed, sketching the unique mountain image. Soon after, she is terrorized in her home by a UFO which descends from the clouds. She fights off violent attempts by the UFO and unseen beings to enter the home, but in the chaos, Barry is abducted.

Lacombe and Laughlin—along with a group of United Nations experts—continue to investigate increasing UFO activity and strange, related occurrences. Witnesses in Dharamsala, Northern India report that the UFOs make distinctive sounds: a five-tone musical phrase in a pentatonic scale. Scientists broadcast the phrase to outer space, but are mystified by the response: a seemingly meaningless series of numbers (104 44 30 40 36 10) repeated over and over until Laughlin, with his background in cartography, recognizes it as a set of geographical coordinates, which point to Devils Tower near Moorcroft, Wyoming. Lacombe and the U.S. military converge on Wyoming. The United States Army evacuates the area, planting false reports in the media that a train wreck has spilled a toxic nerve gas, all the while preparing a secret landing zone for the UFOs and their occupants.

Meanwhile, Roy becomes increasingly erratic and causes Ronnie to abandon him, taking their three children with her. When a news program about the train wreck near Devils Tower airs on television, Roy and Jillian see the same broadcast, recognizing the same mountain they have been seeing. They, along with other travelers experiencing the same visions, set out for Devils Tower in spite of the public warnings about nerve gas.

While most of the travelers are apprehended by the Army, Roy and Jillian persist and make it to the site just as UFOs appear in the night sky. The government specialists at the site begin to communicate with the UFOs, that gradually appear by the dozens, by use of light and sound on a large electrical billboard. Following this, an enormous mothership lands at the site, releasing the missing World War II pilots and Cotopaxi sailors, as well as over a dozen other abductees from long-missing adults to children (and even a few animals), all from different eras and all of whom have strangely not aged since their abductions. Barry also returns and reunites with a relieved Jillian. The government officials decide to include Roy in a group of people whom they had selected to be potential visitors to the mothership, hastily preparing him.

As the extraterrestrials finally emerge from the mothership, they select Roy to join them on their travels. As Roy enters the mothership, one of the extraterrestrials pauses for a few moments with the humans. Lacombe uses Curwen hand signs that correspond to the five-note extraterrestrial tonal phrase. The extraterrestrial replies with the same gestures, smiles, and returns to its ship, which ascends into space.

Cast
 Richard Dreyfuss as Roy Neary, an electrical lineman in Indiana who encounters and forms an obsession with unidentified flying objects. Steve McQueen was Spielberg's first choice. Although McQueen was impressed with the script, he felt that he was not right for the role as he was unable to cry on cue. James Caan, Dustin Hoffman, Al Pacino, and Gene Hackman turned down the part as well. Jack Nicholson turned it down because of scheduling conflicts. Spielberg explained when filming Jaws, "Dreyfuss talked me into casting him. He listened to about 155 days' worth of Close Encounters. He even contributed ideas." Dreyfuss reflected, "I launched myself into a campaign to get the part. I would walk by Steve's office and say stuff like 'Al Pacino has no sense of humor' or 'Jack Nicholson is too crazy'. I eventually convinced him to cast me."
 François Truffaut as Claude Lacombe, a French government scientist in charge of UFO-related activities in the United States. The UFO expert Jacques Vallée served as the real-life model for Lacombe. Gérard Depardieu, Philippe Noiret, Jean-Louis Trintignant, and Lino Ventura were considered for the role. Internationally renowned as a film director, this was Truffaut's only acting role in a film he did not direct as well as his only role in an English-language film. During filming, Truffaut used his free time to write the script for The Man Who Loved Women. He also worked on a novel entitled The Actor, a project he abandoned.
 Teri Garr as Ronnie Neary, Roy's wife. Meryl Streep and Amy Irving also auditioned for the role.
 Melinda Dillon as Jillian Guiler. Teri Garr wanted to portray Jillian, but was cast as Ronnie. Hal Ashby, who worked with Dillon on Bound for Glory (1976), suggested her for the part to Spielberg. Dillon was cast three days before filming began.
 Bob Balaban as David Laughlin, Lacombe's assistant and English-French interpreter
 J. Patrick McNamara as Project Leader
 Warren Kemmerling as Major “Wild Bill” Walsh
 Roberts Blossom as Farmer
 Philip Dodds as Jean Claude
 Cary Guffey as Barry Guiler, Jillian's son. Spielberg conducted a series of method acting techniques to help Guffey, who was cast when he was just three years old.
 Lance Henriksen as Robert
 Merrill Connally as Team Leader
 George DiCenzo as Major Benchley
 Gene Dynarski as Ike
 Josef Sommer as Larry Butler
 Carl Weathers as Military Police
 David Abraham Cheulkar as English-Hindi interpreter

Production

Development
The film's origins can be traced to director Steven Spielberg's childhood, when he and his father watched a meteor shower in New Jersey. At age 18, Spielberg completed the full-length science fiction film Firelight. Many scenes from Firelight were incorporated in Close Encounters on a shot-for-shot basis. In 1970 he wrote a short story entitled "Experiences" about a lovers' lane in a Midwestern farming community and the "light show" a group of teenagers see in the night sky. In late 1973, after completing work on The Sugarland Express, Spielberg developed a deal with Columbia Pictures for a science-fiction film. 20th Century Fox had previously turned down the offer. Julia and Michael Phillips signed on as producers.

Spielberg first considered doing a documentary or low-budget feature film about people who believed in UFOs. He decided "a film that depended on state-of-the-art technology couldn't be made for $2.5 million." Borrowing a phrase from the ending of The Thing from Another World, he retitled the film Watch the Skies, rewriting the premise concerning Project Blue Book and pitching the concept to Willard Huyck and Gloria Katz. Katz remembered, "It had flying saucers from outer space landing on Robertson Boulevard [in West Hollywood, California]. I go, Steve, that's the worst idea I ever heard." Spielberg brought Paul Schrader to write the script in December 1973 with principal photography to begin in late 1974. To discuss the script, Spielberg visited the home where Schrader lived with his brother Leonard. However, Spielberg started work on Jaws in 1974, pushing Watch the Skies back.

With the financial and critical success of Jaws, Spielberg was able to negotiate a vast amount of creative control from Columbia, including the right to make the film any way he wanted. Schrader turned in his script, which Spielberg called "one of the most embarrassing screenplays ever professionally turned in to a major film studio or director" and "a terribly guilt-ridden story not about UFOs at all." Titled Kingdom Come, the script's protagonist was a 45-year-old Air Force officer named Paul Van Owen who worked with Project Blue Book. "[His] job for the government is to ridicule and debunk flying saucers." Schrader continued: "One day he has an encounter. He goes to the government, threatening to blow the lid off to the public. Instead, he and the government spend 15 years trying to make contact."

Spielberg and Schrader experienced creative differences, hiring John Hill to rewrite. At one point the main character was a police officer. Spielberg "[found] it hard to identify with men in uniform. I wanted to have Mr. Everyday Regular Fella." Spielberg rejected the Schrader/Hill script during post-production on Jaws, reflecting that "they wanted to make it like a James Bond adventure".

David Giler performed a rewrite; Hal Barwood and Matthew Robbins, friends of Spielberg, suggested the plot device of a kidnapped child. Spielberg then began to write the script. The song "When You Wish upon a Star" from Pinocchio influenced Spielberg's writing style. "I hung my story on the mood the song created, the way it affected me personally." During pre-production, the title was changed from Kingdom Come to Close Encounters of the Third Kind.

J. Allen Hynek, who worked with the United States Air Force on Project Blue Book, was hired as a scientific consultant. Hynek felt that "even though the film is fiction, it's based for the most part on the known facts of the UFO mystery, and it certainly catches the flavor of the phenomenon. Spielberg was under enormous pressure to make another blockbuster after Jaws, but he decided to make a UFO film. He put his career on the line." USAF and NASA declined to cooperate on the film. In fact, NASA reportedly sent a twenty-page letter to Spielberg, telling him that releasing the film was dangerous. In an interview, he said: "I really found my faith when I heard that the Government was opposed to the film. If NASA took the time to write me a 20-page letter, then I knew there must be something happening."

Early in pre-production, Spielberg hired film title designer Dan Perri to design a logotype for Close Encounters. Perri, who had previously worked on The Exorcist (1973) and Taxi Driver (1976), produced a logotype in Handel Gothic typeface, with only a script to work from. Delighted with the result, Spielberg applied the logo to all production stationery and crew shirts. Unusual in filmmaking, Spielberg carried enough influence to maintain creative control over the film's entire branding and asked Perri to design the advertising campaign and title sequence for Close Encounters based on his logo.

Perri later went on to design titles for many other major Hollywood pictures, including Star Wars (1977), Raging Bull (1980), and Airplane! (1980).

Filming

Principal photography began on May 16, 1976, though an Associated Press report in August 1975 had suggested filming would start in late 1975. Spielberg did not want to do any location shooting because of his negative experience on Jaws and wanted to shoot Close Encounters entirely on sound stages, but eventually dropped the idea.

Filming took place in Burbank, California; Devils Tower National Monument in Wyoming; two abandoned World War II airship hangars at the former Brookley Air Force Base in Mobile, Alabama; and the Louisville and Nashville Railroad depot in Bay Minette, Alabama. The home where Barry is abducted is located outside the town of Fairhope, Alabama. Roy Neary's home is on Carlisle Drive East in Mobile. The UFOs fly through the former toll booth at the Vincent Thomas Bridge, San Pedro, California. The Sonora Desert sequence was photographed at the Dumont Dunes, California, and the Dharmsala-India exteriors were filmed at the small village of Hal near Khalapur, 35 miles (56 km) outside Mumbai, India. The hangars in Alabama were six times larger than the biggest sound stage in the world. Various technical and budgetary problems occurred during filming. Spielberg called Close Encounters "twice as bad and twice as expensive [as Jaws]".

Matters worsened when Columbia Pictures experienced financial difficulties. Spielberg claimed the film would cost $2.7 million to make in his original 1973 pitch to Columbia, although he revealed to producer Julia Philips that he knew the budget would have to be much higher; the final budget came to $19.4 million. Columbia studio executive John Veich remembered, "If we knew it was going to cost that much, we wouldn't have greenlighted it because we didn't have the money." Spielberg hired Joe Alves, his collaborator on Jaws, as production designer. In addition the 1976 Atlantic hurricane season brought tropical storms to Alabama. A large portion of the sound stage in Alabama was damaged because of a lightning strike. Columbia raised $7 million from three sources: Time Inc., EMI, and German tax shelters.

Cinematographer Vilmos Zsigmond said that, during the shooting for the film, Spielberg got more ideas by watching films every night which in turn extended the production schedule because he was continually adding new scenes to be filmed. Zsigmond previously turned down the chance to work on Jaws. In her 1991 book You'll Never Eat Lunch in This Town Again, producer Julia Phillips wrote highly profane remarks about Spielberg, Zsigmond, and Truffaut, because she was fired during post-production due to a cocaine addiction. Phillips blamed it on Spielberg being a perfectionist.

Visual effects

Douglas Trumbull was the visual effects supervisor, while Carlo Rambaldi designed the extraterrestrials. Trumbull joked that the visual effects budget, at $3.3 million, could have been used to produce an additional film. His work helped lead to advances in motion control photography. The mothership was designed by Ralph McQuarrie and built by Greg Jein. The look of the ship was inspired by an oil refinery Spielberg saw at night in India. Instead of the metallic hardware look used in Star Wars, the emphasis was on a more luminescent look for the UFOs. One of the UFO models was an oxygen mask with lights attached to it, used because of its irregular shape. As a subtle in-joke, Dennis Muren (who had just finished working on Star Wars) put a small R2-D2 model onto the underside of the mothership. The model of the mothership is now on display in the Smithsonian Institution's Air and Space Museum Udvar-Hazy Annex at Washington Dulles Airport in Chantilly, Virginia.

Close Encounters was filmed anamorphically and the visual effects sequences were shot on 70 mm film, which has greater resolution than the 35 mm film used for the rest of the production, so that when the miniature effects were combined with full-sized elements through an optical printer, the effects footage would still appear clear and sharp despite having lost a generation's worth of visual data. A test reel using computer-generated imagery was created for the UFOs, but Spielberg found it would be too expensive and ineffective since CGI was in its infancy in the mid-1970s.

The small extraterrestrials in the final scenes were played by fifty local six-year-old girls in Mobile, Alabama. That decision was requested by Spielberg because he felt "girls move more gracefully than boys". Puppetry was attempted for the extraterrestrials, but the idea failed. However, Rambaldi successfully used puppetry to depict two of the extraterrestrials, the first being a marionette (for the tall extraterrestrial that is the first to be seen emerging from the mothership in what was originally a test shot but eventually used in the final film) and an articulated puppet for the extraterrestrial that communicates via hand signals near the end of the film.

Post-production
Close Encounters is the first collaboration between film editor Michael Kahn and Spielberg. Their working relationship has continued for the rest of Spielberg's films. Spielberg said that no film he has ever made since has been as hard to edit as the last 25 minutes of Close Encounters and that he and Kahn went through thousands of feet of footage to find the right shots for the end sequence. When Kahn and Spielberg completed the first cut of the film, Spielberg was dissatisfied, feeling "there wasn't enough wow-ness". Pick-ups were commissioned but cinematographer Vilmos Zsigmond could not participate due to other commitments. John A. Alonzo, László Kovács, and Douglas Slocombe worked on the pick-ups. Lacombe was originally to find Flight 19 hidden in the Amazon rainforest, but the idea was changed to the Sonoran Desert. Spielberg also took 7.5 minutes out from the preview.

Music

The score for the film was composed, conducted and produced by John Williams, who had previously worked on Spielberg's Jaws. Williams wrote over 300 examples of the iconic five-tone motif for Close Encounters—the five tones are used by scientists to communicate with the visiting spaceship as a mathematical language—before Spielberg chose the one incorporated into the film's signature theme. Spielberg called Williams' work "When You Wish Upon a Star meets science fiction". Incidentally, Williams briefly included the song's signature melody in the score at Spielberg's behest, just before Roy Neary turns to board the mothership. The synthesizer used to play the five notes is an ARP 2500. ARP Instruments' Vice President of Engineering, Phillip Dodds, was sent to install the unit on the film set and was subsequently cast as Jean Claude, the musician who plays the sequence on the huge synthesizer in an attempt to communicate with the extraterrestrial mothership. Spielberg initially included Cliff Edwards' original "When You Wish upon a Star" from Pinocchio in the closing credits, but after a Dallas preview where several members of the audience audibly snickered at the inclusion, the song was dropped and replaced with Williams' orchestral version. It was included in the special edition of the end titles on the 1998 Collector's Edition of the soundtrack.

The score was recorded at Warner Bros. Studios in Burbank, California. Williams was nominated for two Academy Awards in 1978, one for his score to Star Wars and one for his score to Close Encounters. He won for Star Wars, though he later won two Grammy Awards in 1979 for his Close Encounters score (one for Best Original Film Score and one for Best Instrumental Composition for "Theme from Close Encounters").

Themes
Film critic Charlene Engel observed Close Encounters "suggests that humankind has reached the point where it is ready to enter the community of the cosmos. While it is a computer which makes the final musical conversation with the extraterrestrial guests possible, the characteristics bringing Neary to make his way to Devils Tower have little to do with technical expertise or computer literacy. These are virtues taught in schools that will be evolved in the 21st century." The film also evokes typical science fiction archetypes and motifs. The film portrays new technologies as a natural and expected outcome of human development and indication of health and growth.

Other critics found a variety of Judeo-Christian analogies. Devils Tower parallels Mount Sinai, the extraterrestrials as God and Roy Neary as Moses. Cecil B. DeMille's The Ten Commandments is seen on television at the Neary household. Some found close relations between Elijah and Roy; Elijah was taken into a "chariot of fire", akin to Roy going in the UFO. Climbing Devils Tower behind the faltering Jillian, Neary exhorts Jillian to keep moving and not to look back, similar to Lot's wife who looked back at Sodom and turned into a pillar of salt. Spielberg explained, "I wanted to make Close Encounters a very accessible story about the everyday individual who has a sighting that overturns his life, and throws it into complete upheaval as he starts to become more and more obsessed with this experience."

Roy's wife Ronnie attempts to hide the sunburn caused by Roy's exposure to the UFOs and wants him to forget his encounter with them. She is embarrassed and bewildered by what has happened to him and desperately wants her ordinary life back. The expression of his lost life is seen when he is sculpting a huge model of Devils Tower in his living room, with his family deserting him. Roy's obsession with an idea implanted by an extraterrestrial intelligence, his construction of the model, and his gradual loss of contact with his wife, mimic the events in the short story "Dulcie and Decorum" (1955) by Damon Knight.

Close Encounters also studies the form of "youth spiritual yearning". Barry Guiler, the unfearing child who refers to the UFOs and their paraphernalia as "toys" (although that was unscripted, with the child being drawn to smile by being shown toys offstage), serves as a motif for childlike innocence and openness in the face of the unknown. Spielberg also compared the theme of communication as highlighting that of tolerance. "If we can talk to extraterrestrials in Close Encounters of the Third Kind", he said, "why not with the Reds in the Cold War?" Sleeping is the final obstacle to overcome in the ascent of Devils Tower. Roy, Jillian and a third invitee, Larry Butler, climb the mountain pursued by government helicopters spraying sleeping gas. Larry stops to rest, is gassed, and falls into a deep sleep.

In his interview with Spielberg on Inside the Actors Studio, James Lipton suggested Close Encounters has another, more personal theme for Spielberg: "Your father was a computer engineer; your mother was a concert pianist, and when the spaceship lands, they make music together on the computer", suggesting that Roy Neary's boarding the spaceship is Spielberg's wish to be reunited with his parents. In a 2005 interview, Spielberg stated that he made Close Encounters when he did not have children, and if he were making it today, he would never have had Neary leave his family and board the mothership.

Communication and language issues constitute additional themes as noted by Andrew Johnston in Time Out New York: "Throughout the film, there are many scenes that anticipate themes Spielberg would explore in subsequent projects, but his execution of these ideas here is usually more interesting and subtle. In Amistad, for example, he devotes much time to illustrating the language barrier separating Africans from both their captors and their potential saviors. It's an essential plot point, but it's so belabored that the story gets bogged down. In CE3K, the language problem is illustrated concisely by a quick scene in which an interpreter translates Spanish into English for Laughlin so he can turn around and translate it into French for Lacombe. Since Spielberg doesn't ram the language problem down our throats, the extraterrestrials' solution—using music to communicate with humanity—seems more elegant and natural."

Release and reception

Box office
The film was to be released in summer 1977 but was pushed back to November because of the various problems during production.

Close Encounters premiered at the Ziegfeld Theatre in New York City on November 16, 1977, and played there and at the Cinerama Dome in Los Angeles, grossing $1,077,000 prior to its national release on December 14, when it opened in 270 theatres grossing $10,115,000 in a week with a per-screen average of $37,460. It added 301 more theatres on December 21. By the end of the second week of national release it had grossed $24,695,317.

It made a record $3,026,558 on December 26, 1977, and set a one-week record of $17,393,654 from December 26 to January 1. The film opened overseas on February 24, 1978, and grossed $27 million internationally by the end of March from 19 countries. Close Encounters received mostly positive reviews and became a certified box office success, grossing $116.39 million in the United States and Canada, and $171.7 million in foreign countries, for $288 million worldwide.

It was Columbia Pictures' most successful film at that time.

Critical reception
Jonathan Rosenbaum refers to the film as "the best expression of Spielberg's benign, dreamy-eyed vision". A.D. Murphy of Variety magazine gave a positive review but wrote that Close Encounters "lacks the warmth and humanity" of George Lucas's Star Wars. Murphy found most of the film slow-paced, but praised the climax. On Sneak Previews, Gene Siskel and Roger Ebert highly recommended the film. Siskel praised the film's message about not being "afraid of the unknown," said Dreyfuss was "perfectly cast" and described the ending as "a wonderful scene, combining fantasy, adventure and mystery." He mentioned, however, that the picture got "bogged down" by a subplot in the middle. Ebert said "the last 30 minutes are among the most marvelous things I've ever seen on the screen" and that the film was "like a kid's picture...in its innocence." Pauline Kael similarly called it "a kid's film in the best sense". Jean Renoir compared Spielberg's storytelling to Jules Verne and Georges Méliès. Ray Bradbury declared it the greatest science fiction film ever made.

Reissues and home media
On the final cut privilege, Spielberg was dissatisfied with the film. Columbia Pictures was experiencing financial problems, and they were depending on this film to save their company. "I wanted to have another six months to finish off this film, and release it in summer 1978. They told me they needed this film out immediately", Spielberg explained. "Anyway, Close Encounters was a huge financial success and I told them I wanted to make my own director's cut. They agreed on the condition that I show the inside of the mothership so they could have something to hang a [reissue marketing] campaign on. I never should have shown the inside of the mothership."

In 1979, Columbia gave Spielberg $1.5 million to produce what became the "Special Edition" of the film. Spielberg added seven minutes of new footage, but also deleted or shortened various existing scenes by ten minutes, so that the Special Edition was three minutes shorter than the original 1977 release, running 132 minutes. The Special Edition featured several new character development scenes, the discovery of the SS Cotopaxi in the Gobi Desert, and a view of the inside of the mothership. Close Encounters of the Third Kind: The Special Edition was released in August 1980, making a further $15.7 million, accumulating a final $303.7 million box office gross. Roger Ebert "thought the original film was an astonishing achievement, capturing the feeling of awe and wonder we have when considering the likelihood of life beyond the Earth. ... This new version ... is, quite simply, a better film ... Why didn't Spielberg make it this good the first time?"

The 1980 Special Edition was the only version officially available for many years on VHS. Then, in 1990, The Criterion Collection offered two versions for LaserDisc, one a variant of the original 1977 edition (with subtle edits made by Spielberg—this became the syndicated television version), the other the Special Edition (programmed by the viewer using their LaserDisc player's remote features that predated the seamless branching of DVDs). This triple-disc LaserDisc set also included an interactive "Making Close Encounters" documentary featuring interviews with Spielberg and other cast and crew involved with the film, as well as stills and script excerpts. In 1993, the Special Edition was released on VHS and LaserDisc and did not see a further release for 14 years.

Vincent Misiano reviewed Close Encounters: The Special Edition in Ares Magazine #5 and commented that "Artists in other media have always had the luxury of returning to a piece, reworking and refining it. For various reasons, money first among them, this opportunity has rarely been afforded to filmmakers. Steven Spielberg has been given the chance and used it well."

On May 12, 1998, Spielberg recut Close Encounters again for the "Director's Cut", released as simply the "Collector's Edition" on VHS. This version of the film is a re-edit of the original 1977 release with some elements of the 1980 Special Edition, but omits the mothership interior scenes as Spielberg felt they should have remained a mystery. The director's cut is the longest release of the film, running at 137 minutes, two minutes longer than the theatrical version and five minutes longer than the special edition. A LaserDisc release of the Collector's Edition, released on July 14, 1998, includes a new 101-minute documentary, The Making of Close Encounters, which was produced in 1997 and features interviews with Spielberg, the main cast and notable crew members. There have also been many other alternative versions of the film for network and syndicated television, as well as the aforementioned Criterion LaserDisc version. Some of these combined all released material from the 1977 and 1980 versions. However, most of these versions were not edited by Spielberg, who regards the "Collector's Edition" as his definitive version of Close Encounters. The Collector's Edition was given a limited release as part of a roadshow featuring select films to celebrate Columbia Pictures' 75th anniversary in 1999. It was the first time this version of the film had been shown theatrically. The director's cut was once again released in theaters on September 1, 2017 in tribute to the film's 40th anniversary. It made $1.8 million in the weekend ($2.3 million over the four-day Labor Day holiday), pushing its career global gross to over $306 million worldwide.

Close Encounters was released on DVD on May 29, 2001, in a two-disc "Collector's Edition" set that contained only the director's cut. This set contained several extra features, including the 1997 "making of" documentary, a featurette from 1977, trailers and deleted scenes that included the mothership interior from the 1980 Special Edition. A single-disc DVD edition of the film was released on August 27, 2002. In tribute to the film's 30th anniversary, Sony Pictures released the film on DVD and Blu-ray in 2007. For the first time, all three versions were packaged together. Then in 2017, in honor of its 40th anniversary, the film was given a 4K restoration of the original camera negative. Following its theatrical re-release of the director's cut, the film was released in 4K and Blu-ray with all three versions given the same 4K treatment.

Accolades

American Film Institute Lists
 AFI's 100 Years...100 Movies: #64
 AFI's 100 Years...100 Thrills: #31
 AFI's 100 Years of Film Scores: Nominated
 AFI's 100 Years...100 Cheers: #58
 AFI's 100 Years...100 Movies (10th Anniversary Edition): Nominated
 AFI's 10 Top 10: Nominated Science Fiction Film

Legacy

Shortly after the film's release in late 1977, Spielberg desired to do either a sequel or prequel, before deciding against it. He explained, "The army's knowledge and ensuing cover-up is so subterranean that it would take a creative screen story, perhaps someone else making the picture and giving it the equal time it deserves."

When asked in 1980 to select a single "master image" that summed up his film career, Spielberg chose the shot of Barry opening his living room door to see the blazing orange light from the UFO. "That was beautiful but awful light, just like fire coming through the doorway. [Barry's] very small, and it's a very large door, and there's a lot of promise or danger outside that door." In 2007, Close Encounters was deemed "culturally, historically, or aesthetically significant" by the United States Library of Congress and was added to the National Film Registry for preservation. In American Film Institute polls, Close Encounters has been voted the 64th-greatest American film, the 31st-most thrilling, and the 58th-most inspiring. It was also nominated for the top 10 science fiction films in AFI's 10 Top 10 and the tenth-anniversary edition of the 100 Movies list. The score by John Williams was nominated for AFI's 100 Years of Film Scores.

Alongside Star Wars and Superman, Close Encounters led to the reemergence of science fiction films. In 1985 Spielberg donated $100,000 to the Planetary Society for Megachannel ExtraTerrestrial Assay. In the 1979 James Bond film Moonraker the five-note sequence is heard when a scientist punches the combination into an electronic door lock. In the 2009 comedy film Monsters vs. Aliens, the president of the United States plays the five-note sequence on a synthesizer while attempting "first contact" with an extraterrestrial robot. In the South Park episode "Imaginationland", a government scientist uses the five-note sequence to try to open a portal. In "Over Logging", a government scientist uses the five-note sequence to try to get the central Internet router working. The "mashed potato" sculpture was parodied in the films UHF, and Canadian Bacon, and episodes of Spaced, The X-Files, That '70s Show, The IT Crowd, and The Simpsons. It was satirized in the 200th issue of Mad, July 1978, by Stan Hart and Mort Drucker as Clod Encounters of the Absurd Kind.

In 2011, ABC aired a primetime special, Best in Film: The Greatest Movies of Our Time, that counted down the best films chosen by fans based on results of a poll conducted by ABC and People magazine. Close Encounters of the Third Kind was selected as the #5 Best Sci-Fi Film. The Guardian also selected the film as the 11th best Sci-Fi and fantasy film of all-time.

Many prominent film directors have cited Close Encounters of the Third Kind as one of their favorites including Stanley Kubrick, Edgar Wright, Bong Joon-ho, Spike Lee, Denis Villeneuve, and Andrew Stanton.

See also
 List of films featuring extraterrestrials

Notes

References

Bibliography

Further reading
 
 
 
  Novelization of the film.

External links

Close Encounters of the Third Kind essay by Matt Zoller Seitz at National Film Registry 
Close Encounters of the Third Kind essay by Daniel Eagan in America's Film Legacy: The Authoritative Guide to the Landmark Movies in the National Film Registry, A&C Black, 2010 , pages 743-745 
 
 
 
 
 
 
 
 Close Encounters of the Third Kind at Filmsite.org

1970s science fiction drama films
1970s science fiction films
1970s American films
1970s English-language films
1977 drama films
Alien abduction films
Alien visitations in films
American science fiction drama films
American science fiction films
Columbia Pictures films
EMI Films films
Films about dysfunctional families
Films adapted into comics
Films based on urban legends
Films directed by Steven Spielberg
Films produced by Julia Phillips
Films produced by Michael Phillips (producer)
Films scored by John Williams
Films set in Indiana
Films set in India
Films set in Indianapolis
Films set in Wyoming
Films shot in California
Films shot in Mobile, Alabama
Films shot in Wyoming
Films that won the Best Sound Editing Academy Award
Films whose cinematographer won the Best Cinematography Academy Award
Films with screenplays by Steven Spielberg
Films shot in India
Marvin the Martian films
UFO-related films
United States National Film Registry films